Kenneth E. "Boom" Gaspar (born February 3, 1953) is an American musician. He has performed as a keyboardist with American rock band Pearl Jam since 2002.

Biography

Early life
Boom Gaspar grew up in Waimānalo, Hawaii. He started playing music when he was eleven years old. After graduating from Kailua High School, Gaspar spent the next thirty years doing local shows throughout Hawaii with acts such as the Mackey Feary Band, Harmony, Simplisity, and played in Seattle with first billing with the famous blues guitarist Albert Collins.

Pearl Jam

Pearl Jam frontman Eddie Vedder first met Gaspar while in Hawaii. Gaspar was introduced to Vedder through Ramones bassist C. J. Ramone. Gaspar has appeared on the Pearl Jam albums Riot Act (2002), Pearl Jam (2006) and Lightning Bolt (2013). He has a songwriting credit for the song "Love Boat Captain" which is on Riot Act. According to Gaspar, the song initially developed out of a jam session he had with Vedder shortly after the two first met. When they were done, Vedder asked Gaspar if he was "ready to go to Seattle." He has become known for his long solos during "Crazy Mary", a song originally written by Victoria Williams, which has become a fan favorite during live Pearl Jam shows. This often culminates in a guitar/organ duel between Gaspar and guitarist Mike McCready. Gaspar told Keyboard Magazine that his biggest challenge playing with the band was "learning what Pearl Jam is, and learning each of the band members’ different styles. It’s such an education for me. Every night is different and playing with them is amazing. I love challenges. They make you a better player and challenges are what music is all about."

Discography

Pearl Jam discography

Po & the 4Fathers discography

References

External links
 
 

1953 births
Living people
American male organists
American rock pianists
American rock keyboardists
Pearl Jam members
People from Honolulu County, Hawaii
Musicians from Hawaii
American blues pianists
American male pianists
20th-century American pianists
21st-century American keyboardists
21st-century organists
American organists